"Take Five" is a jazz standard originally recorded by the Dave Brubeck Quartet.

Take Five or Take 5 also may refer to :

Music 
 Take 5 (band), an American boy band (with an eponymous album)
 Take Five (revue), a 1957 American musical revue
 "Take 5", a song by Hikaru Utada from Heart Station

Television and radio 
 Take Five (TV series), a 1987 American sitcom
 Take Five (XM), a former XM Satellite Radio channel
 Take Five, a Canadian radio program replaced by Here's to You

Other uses 
 Take 5 (candy), a Hershey candy bar 
 Take 5 (magazine), an Australian women's magazine
 Take Five, a music application from The Iconfactory
 Take Five Scholars, an academic program at the University of Rochester
 Take 5, a New York Lottery game
 Take Five, a novel by D. Keith Mano

See also
 Take Five Live, a 1961 album by Carmen McRae